Antoine "T.C.D." Lundy (February 3, 1963 – January 18, 1998) was an American singer who was a member of the contemporary R&B group Force MDs, whose other members included his brother Stevie D, their uncle Jesse Lee Daniels, and friends Trisco Pearson and Charles "Mercury" Nelson. The group had a string of R&B hits through the 1980s, scoring a top-ten pop hit was the slow jam "Tender Love," which was featured in the 1985 film Krush Groove. The group also appeared in the hip hop-inspired motion picture Rappin' (1985). 1987 produced the group's first R&B #1, "Love is a House".

By the mid-1980s, T.C.D. had emerged as one of the preeminent lead vocalists of the group. He is featured as the lead singer on many of the band's most successful hit singles, including both "Tender Love" and "Love is a House."  In addition, T.C.D. co-wrote many of the band's songs. In style, Lundy had a falsetto voice that was reminiscent of Earth, Wind and Fire's Philip Bailey.

Lundy died of Lou Gehrig's disease in 1998, after having endured the condition for two years. In addition to his parents and siblings, Lundy was survived by his wife, Denise, along with eight children.

Discography
Love Letters (1984)
Chillin''' (1985)Touch & Go (1987)Step to Me (1990)Moments in TimeFilmography
 1985: Rappin' 1989: Limit Up''

References

1963 births
1998 deaths
American rhythm and blues singer-songwriters
Neurological disease deaths in Pennsylvania
Deaths from motor neuron disease
People from Staten Island
20th-century American singers
Singer-songwriters from New York (state)